Popa is an African genus of praying mantids in the subfamily Popinae and new (2019) family Deroplatyidae.

Species  
The Mantodea Species File lists two species:
 Popa gracilis Schulthess-Schindler, 1898
 Popa spurca Stal, 1856

References

External links 

Mantodea genera
Deroplatyidae